Spy × Family is an anime television series based on the manga series of the same title by Tatsuya Endo. Produced by Wit Studio and CloverWorks, the series is directed by Kazuhiro Furuhashi, with character designs by Kazuaki Shimada while Kazuaki Shimada and Kyoji Asano are chief animation directors. The music is produced by Know_Name. It was first announced in October 2021.

The series follows master spy Twilight, who must disguise himself as psychiatrist Loid Forger and build a mock family in order to investigate political leader Donovan Desmond. Unbeknownst to him, his wife, Yor, is actually an assassin known as the Thorn Princess, while his daughter, Anya, has telepathic abilities.

The first season of series consisted of 25 episodes separated into 2 parts. The first part consists of 12 episodes, aired in Japan from April 9 to June 25, 2022, on TV Tokyo and other networks. The first opening theme song,  by Official Hige Dandism, and the first ending theme song,  by Gen Hoshino are used in this part. The second part consists of 13 episodes, aired in Japan from October 1 to December 24, 2022. For this part, the second opening theme song, "Souvenir" by Bump of Chicken, and the second ending theme song,  by Yama, are used. A second season and a theatrical film were announced in December 2022, and will both premiere in 2023.

The series is licensed for streaming by Crunchyroll outside of Asia, while it is distributed by Muse Communication in South and Southeast Asia.

Series overview

Episode list

Season 1 (2022)

Home media release

Notes

References

External links
 Spy × Family at Crunchyroll
 

Spy X Family
Spy × Family